The 2017–18 Håndboldligaen, known as the 888ligaen for sponsorship reasons, is the 82nd season of the Håndboldligaen, Denmark's premier handball league.

Team information 

14 clubs competed in the Håndboldligaen during the 2017–18 season:

Personnel and kits
Following is the list of clubs competing in 2017–18 Håndboldligaen, with their manager, kit manufacturer and shirt sponsor.

Managerial changes

Regular season

Standings

! There's a new relegation playoff made in November 2014

Schedule and results

No. 1-8 from the regular season divided into two groups with the top two will advance to the semifinals

Top goalscorers

Regular season

Overall season

Winner's playoff

Group 1

Group 2

Playoff

Semifinal

! Best of three matches. In the case of a tie after the second match, a third match is played. Highest ranking team in the regular season has the home advantage in the first and possible third match.

3rd place

! Best of three matches. In the case of a tie after the second match, a third match is played. Highest ranking team in the regular season has the home advantage in the first and possible third match.

Final

! Best of three matches. In the case of a tie after the second match, a third match is played. Highest ranking team in the regular season has the home advantage in the first and possible third match.

Relegation playoff
No. 5 from the relegation playoff and winner, of the playoff match between 2nd and 3rd, from the first division is meet each other for the last seat. The winner stays in the league. the loser relegated to Division 1.

Number of teams by regions

References

External links
 Danish Handball Federaration 

2017–18 domestic handball leagues
Handboldligaen
Handball competitions in Denmark
2018 in Danish sport